Abdulahi Ahmed Afrah is a Somali politician who hails from the Waesle clan (an Abgaal subclan).  In June 2007, he escaped an assassination attempt in northern Mogadishu.

References

Living people
Somalian politicians
Year of birth missing (living people)
Place of birth missing (living people)